Lagoinha is a Belo Horizonte Metro station on Line 1. It was opened on 1 August 1986 as the eastern terminus of the inaugural section of the line, from Eldorado to Lagoinha. In April 1987, the line was extended to Central. The station is located between Carlos Prates and Central.

References

Belo Horizonte Metro stations
1986 establishments in Brazil
Railway stations opened in 1986